In enzymology, an alkanesulfonate monooxygenase is an enzyme that catalyzes the chemical reaction

an alkanesulfonate (R-CH2-SO3H) + FMNH2 + O2  an aldehyde (R-CHO) + FMN + sulfite + H2O

The 3 substrates of this enzyme are alkanesulfonate (R-CH2-SO3H), FMNH2, and O2, whereas its 4 products are aldehyde, FMN, sulfite, and H2O.

This enzyme belongs to the family of oxidoreductases, specifically those acting on paired donors, with O2 as oxidant and incorporation or reduction of oxygen. The oxygen incorporated need not be derived from O2 with reduced flavin or flavoprotein as one donor, and incorporation of one atom of oxygen into the other donor. The systematic name of this enzyme class is alkanesulfonate, reduced-FMN:oxygen oxidoreductase. Other names in common use include SsuD, and sulfate starvation-induced protein 6.

References

External links
 
 Xuanzhi Zhan, Russell A. Carpenter, and Holly R. Ellis, "Catalytic Importance of the Substrate Binding Order for the FMNH2-Dependent Alkanesulfonate Monooxygenase Enzyme", Biochemistry, 2008, 47 (7), pp. 2221–2230.

EC 1.14.14
Enzymes of unknown structure